Google JAX is a machine learning framework for transforming numerical functions. It is described as bringing together a modified version of autograd (automatic obtaining of the gradient function through differentiation of a function) and TensorFlow's XLA (Accelerated Linear Algebra). It is designed to follow the structure and workflow of NumPy as closely as possible and works with various existing frameworks such as TensorFlow and PyTorch. The primary functions of JAX are:

 grad: automatic differentiation
 jit: compilation
 vmap: auto-vectorization
 pmap: SPMD programming

grad 

The below code demonstrates the grad function's automatic differentiation. 

# imports
from jax import grad
import jax.numpy as jnp

# define the logistic function
def logistic(x):  
    return jnp.exp(x) / (jnp.exp(x) + 1)

# obtain the gradient function of the logistic function
grad_logistic = grad(logistic)

# evaluate the gradient of the logistic function at x = 1 
grad_log_out = grad_logistic(1.0)   
print(grad_log_out) 

The final line should outputː

0.19661194

jit 

The below code demonstrates the jit function's optimization through fusion.

# imports
from jax import jit
import jax.numpy as jnp

# define the cube function
def cube(x):
    return x * x * x

# generate data
x = jnp.ones((10000, 10000))

# create the jit version of the cube function
jit_cube = jit(cube)

# apply the cube and jit_cube functions to the same data for speed comparison
cube(x)
jit_cube(x)

The computation time for jit_cube (line no.17) should be noticeably shorter than that for cube (line no.16). Increasing the values on line no. 7, will increase the difference.

vmap 

The below code demonstrates the vmap function's vectorization.

# imports
from functools import partial
from jax import vmap
import jax.numpy as jnp

# define function
def grads(self, inputs):
    in_grad_partial = partial(self._net_grads, self._net_params)
    grad_vmap = jax.vmap(in_grad_partial)
    rich_grads = grad_vmap(inputs)
    flat_grads = np.asarray(self._flatten_batch(rich_grads))
    assert flat_grads.ndim == 2 and flat_grads.shape[0] == inputs.shape[0]
    return flat_grads 

The GIF on the right of this section illustrates the notion of vectorized addition.

pmap 

The below code demonstrates the pmap function's parallelization for matrix multiplication.

# import pmap and random from JAX; import JAX NumPy
from jax import pmap, random
import jax.numpy as jnp

# generate 2 random matrices of dimensions 5000 x 6000, one per device
random_keys = random.split(random.PRNGKey(0), 2)
matrices = pmap(lambda key: random.normal(key, (5000, 6000)))(random_keys)

# without data transfer, in parallel, perform a local matrix multiplication on each CPU/GPU
outputs = pmap(lambda x: jnp.dot(x, x.T))(matrices)

# without data transfer, in parallel, obtain the mean for both matrices on each CPU/GPU separately
means = pmap(jnp.mean)(outputs)
print(means)

The final line should print the valuesː

[1.1566595 1.1805978]

Libraries using Jax 
Several python libraries use Jax as a backend, including:

 Flax, a high level neural network library initially developed by Google Brain.
 Haiku, an object-oriented library for neural networks developed by DeepMind.
 Equinox, a library that revolves around the idea of representing parameterised functions (including neural networks) as PyTrees. It was created by Patrick Kidger.
 Optax, a library for gradient processing and optimisation developed by DeepMind.
 RLax, a library for developing reinforcement learning agents developed by DeepMind.

See also 

 NumPy
 TensorFlow
 PyTorch
 CUDA
 Automatic differentiation
 Just-in-time compilation
 Vectorization
 Automatic parallelization

External links 
 Documentationː 
 Colab (Jupyter/iPython) Quickstart Guideː 
 TensorFlow's XLAː  (Accelerated Linear Algebra)
 
 Original paperː

References 

Machine learning
Google